Ghriss Airport  is a civilian airport in Mascara Province, Algeria, located  southwest of the town of Ghriss, Algeria.

World War II
During World War II, the facility was known as "Thiersville Airfield".  It was a Twelfth Air Force base of operations during the North African Campaign used by the 60th Troop Carrier Group, which flew C-47 Skytrain transports from the airfield between May and June 1943.

Airlines and destinations

References

 Maurer, Maurer. Air Force Combat Units of World War II. Maxwell AFB, Alabama: Office of Air Force History, 1983. .

External links
 Google Maps - Ghriss

Algerian AIP and Chart

Airports in Algeria
Buildings and structures in Mascara Province
Airfields of the United States Army Air Forces in Algeria
World War II airfields in Algeria